Stenton is a parish and village in East Lothian, Scotland.

Stenton may also refer to:

People 
 Doris Mary Stenton, Lady Stenton (1894–1971), an English historian of the Middle Ages.
 Sir Frank Stenton (17 May 1880 – 15 September 1967), a 20th-century historian of Anglo-Saxon England.
 Henry Stenton (15 September 1815 – 6 March 1887), an English first-class cricketer and solicitor. 
 John Stenton (born 26 October 1924), a cricketer.

Places 
 Stenton (mansion), the country home of James Logan.
 Stenton station, a regional railway station in Philadelphia, USA.